Dulcigno, modern day Ulcinj, was under Venetian rule between 1405–1412 and 1421–1571. During this time, the Venetian governors of Dulcigno held the title of Count and Captain or provveditore (overseer).

List of governors

See also 

 List of Mayors of Ulcinj
 List of Venetian governors of Kotor

References 

Ulcinj
Venetian period in the history of Montenegro
Venetian period in the history of Albania
Venetian governors
Republic of Venice-related lists